Damn Yankees was an American rock supergroup formed in Syracuse, New York, in 1989. Consisting of Tommy Shaw of Styx, Jack Blades of Night Ranger, Ted Nugent of The Amboy Dukes, and Michael Cartellone (then an unknown drummer who would later join Lynyrd Skynyrd).

They are remembered for the songs "High Enough" and "Where You Goin' Now", both Top 40 hits in the early 1990s.

History
In the late 1980s, the US rock music scene witnessed a trend for supergroups; Bad English, Mr. Big and Badlands were all formed around the time. Shaw, Blades, and Nugent⁠ formed Damn Yankees in 1989 in response to declining commercial success of their original bands. Produced by rock producer Ron Nevison, the newly formed band's self-titled debut album was released in 1990 and went double-platinum (in 2004). Jack Blades's leading single "Coming of Age" hit No. 60 on the U.S. Hot 100 and No. 1 on the AOR charts, while Shaw-penned "Come Again" received extensive AOR airplay.

The power ballad "High Enough" became their best selling single rising to No. 3 on U.S. Billboard Hot 100 and No. 2 on AOR charts at the beginning of 1991. "High Enough" was Ted Nugent's first mainstream top ten single. The band's songs appeared on several Hollywood film soundtracks, such as Gremlins 2: The New Batch, Nothing But Trouble and The Taking of Beverly Hills.

After the release of their debut, the Damn Yankees went on an 18-month world tour with the likes of a revamped Bad Company, Poison and Jackyl. Their US tour coincided with the Persian Gulf War, in which the band unfurled American flags and made patriotic statements.

In 1992, Damn Yankees went gold with their follow-up album Don't Tread. The title song, sung by Blades, was included on the album Barcelona Gold, released in coordination with the Barcelona Olympic Games. Nugent also appeared on Rock the Vote, voicing support for the GOP against Bill Clinton. Although the second release was not as successful as the first album, it spawned several hits, such as "Mister Please," "Where You Goin' Now," and "The Silence Is Broken," a power ballad featured in the 1993 Jean-Claude Van Damme film Nowhere to Run.

Shaw Blades
In 1994, Nugent revived his solo career, leaving Tommy Shaw and Jack Blades to record their own album as the duo Shaw Blades. Released in 1995, Hallucination received very little support from its label as a personnel change brought industry executives more sympathetic to alternative and grunge bands. Ultimately, the Shaw Blades album came out to some critical praise, but it vanished without major single support or a national tour (which had been cancelled by Warner Bros.). "I'll Always Be With You" did garner some AOR airplay, and the title track was heard in the hit movie Tommy Boy, but after a brief West Coast tour, both Shaw and Blades went back to their respective original bands, Styx and Night Ranger.

In 2007, Shaw Blades released their new album Influence, which consisted solely of cover songs that influenced them, mostly from the 1960s and 1970s. The pair also recorded a cover of the classic Christmas song "The Twelve Days of Christmas" on the "A Classic Rock Christmas" album by various Classic Rock artists in 2002. Both members still principally record and perform with their respective original bands.

Reunions
During a hiatus in both Night Ranger and Styx, Shaw and Blades met with Ted Nugent to record a new Damn Yankees album in 1999. However, the album, provisionally titled Bravo, failed to please either the band members or the prospective record labels. Some of this unused material may have surfaced on various group and solo albums of the band members.

While on the VH1 Classic show Power Ballads of 88, Jack Blades commented about recent rumors regarding Damn Yankees. Jack said he, Ted, and Tommy had been talking and hanging out. Jack then said there would be new music and a tour from Damn Yankees in the future.

In 2004 at Alice Cooper's Christmas Pudding, an annual charity concert to benefit Alice Cooper's Solid Rock Foundation and Teen Center in Phoenix, AZ, Damn Yankees reunited on stage. The band played "Don't Tread", "High Enough" and "Coming of Age".

On January 15, 2010 at the NAMM Show in Anaheim, California, the original members of Damn Yankees made a surprise appearance at the Taylor Guitars exhibit. Jack Blades, Tommy Shaw, Ted Nugent, and Michael Cartellone performed an acoustic set on the Taylor Stage including hits such as "Coming of Age", "High Enough", and the Ted Nugent anthem "Cat Scratch Fever".

In 2011, Nugent joined Jack Blades' band Night Ranger to record an extended version of "Coming of Age" as a B-side for their album "Somewhere in California." In place of his original solo, Nugent plays a version of the guitar solo from "Stranglehold."

In May 2017, Cartellone joined Night Ranger at the Wildflower Festival in Richardson, Texas for a performance of "Coming of Age."

As far as a potential Damn Yankees reunion goes, Cartellone told Cleveland NBC affiliate WKYC that he and other members of the band have continued to meet and write over the years. While a new album has yet to materialize, he says that does not mean the Damn Yankees are finished. They never purposefully disbanded and are keeping a reunion an open door to this day.

Band members

Former members
Tommy Shaw – rhythm & lead guitars, lead & backing vocals (1989–1996, 1998–2001, 2004, 2010)
Jack Blades – bass guitar, lead & backing vocals (1989–1996, 1998–2001, 2004, 2010)
Ted Nugent – lead & rhythm guitars, backing & lead vocals (1989–1996, 1998–2001, 2004, 2010)
Michael Cartellone – drums, percussion, backing vocals (1989–1996, 1998–2001, 2004, 2010)

Session members
Robbie Buchanan – keyboards on Don't Tread (1992 — multiple tracks)

Discography

Studio albums

Live albums
Extended Versions (2008)

Compilation albums
The Essentials (2002)
Rhino Hi-Five: Damn Yankees EP (2005)
High Enough - Best of: Damn Yankees (2019)

Singles

Soundtrack appearances
 "Bonestripper" (from Nothing but Trouble) (1991)

Music videos

References

External links

It's Just Them Damn Yankees
It's Just Those Damn Yankees

Glam metal musical groups from California
Hard rock musical groups from California
Heavy metal musical groups from California
Heavy metal supergroups
Musical groups established in 1989
Musical groups disestablished in 1996
Musical groups reestablished in 1998
Musical groups disestablished in 2001
Ted Nugent